Progressions of Power is the fourth studio album by Canadian hard rock band Triumph, released in 1980. The album reached number 32 on the Billboard 200 and the single "I Can Survive" hit number 91 on the Billboard Hot 100 in 1980. The single "I Live for the Weekend", though not a success in the band's home country, gave them their only charting single in the United Kingdom, where it peaked at number 59. The album was re-released in 1985 on MCA Records, then on TRC Records in 1995, and remastered in 2005 and re-issued on the band's own label TML Entertainment (formerly known as TRC Records).

Track listing

Personnel
 Rik Emmett – guitars, Prophet 5 synthesizer, vocals
 Gil Moore – drums, percussion, vocals
 Mike Levine – bass, keyboards

Production
 Robin Brouwers – assistant engineer
 Jeff Stobbs – assistant engineer
 Mick Walsh – assistant engineer
 John Golden – mastering
 Bob Ludwig – remastering on 1985 and 1995 re-issues
 Brett Zilahi – remastering on 2005 re-issue
 John Rowlands – photography
 Nick Sangiamo – photography

Charts

Certifications

References

at Metalworks Studios, Mississauga, ON, Canada

1980 albums
Triumph (band) albums
Albums recorded at Metalworks Studios